Normandin is a city located on the west side of Lac Saint-Jean in the Canadian province of Quebec.

Normandin is named after the surveyor Joseph-Laurent Normandin. Its history of European-Canadian settlement began in 1878 when the first pioneers arrived. Alphonse Laliberté was elected as Normandin's first mayor in 1890. In 1926, the village was set up as a municipality distinct from the township; the notary J.S.N. Turcotte occupied the function of first magistrate.

The city is the birthplace of radio talk show psychiatrist Pierre Mailloux.  It is also the hometown (though not birthplace) of André Dédé Fortin, the late lead singer of Les Colocs.

Demographics 

In 2021, the median age was 45.2, as opposed to 41.6 for all of Canada. French was the mother tongue of 99.5% of residents in 2021. The next most common mother tongues were English at 0.3%, followed by Spanish at 0.2%. 0.3% reported both English and French as their first language.

As of 2021, Indigenous peoples comprised 5.2% of the population, most of whom were Métis, and visible minorities contributed 0.5%. The largest visible minority groups in Normandin are Black (0.2%) and Latin American (0.2%).

In 2021, 78.9% of the population identified as Catholic, a 22.0% decrease from 2011, while 14.5% said they had no religious affiliation. Jehovah's Witnesses were the largest religious minority, making up 0.7% of the population. There were no non-Christian religious minorities.

Counting both single and multiple responses, the most commonly identified ethnocultural ancestries were:

(Percentages may total more than 100% due to rounding and multiple responses).

Population trend:
 Population in 2021: 2991 (2016 to 2021 population change: -1.4%)
 Population in 2016: 3033 
 Population in 2011: 3137 
 Population in 2006: 3220
 Population in 2001: 3524
 Population in 1996: 3873
 Population in 1991: 3957

Notable people
Gilles Bouchard (born 1971), Canadian ice hockey coach
 Pierre Mailloux (born 1949), Canadian psychiatrist and radio host

References

External links

Cities and towns in Quebec
Incorporated places in Saguenay–Lac-Saint-Jean
Maria-Chapdelaine Regional County Municipality